Vamp is a 1986 American black comedy horror film directed by Richard Wenk, co-written by Wenk and Donald P. Borchers, and starring Grace Jones and Chris Makepeace.

Plot
Two college students, Keith and AJ, want to hire a stripper to buy their way into a campus fraternity. They borrow a Cadillac from lonely rich student Duncan, who insists on coming with them to scope out strip clubs in a nearby city. The three boys find themselves at a club in a shady part of town, and after being impressed by a surreally artistic stripper, Katrina, AJ visits her dressing room to try to convince her to come strip for their college party. Katrina seduces AJ, then pins him down – killing him with a fatal bite to the neck.

Keith becomes concerned at his friend’s delay and gets help from a waitress named Amaretto, who keeps insisting (to his confusion) that she knows him. They search the neighborhood, and Keith is separated from her while trying to escape from both a psychotic albino street gang, as well as from vampires throughout the area. While hiding in a dumpster, he finds AJ's discarded body, but when he calls the cops and returns to the club to accuse the owners, the vampires have preempted him by bringing AJ back to the club as undead. AJ confesses to Keith that he's now a vampire, and after realizing that Keith will not kill him and is willing to die for him, AJ stakes himself with a piece of broken furniture.

Keith, Amaretto, and Duncan flee the club, but their car is rammed by vehicles driven by vampires. After escaping, they realize that Duncan has been turned to a vampire, and they abandon him in a burning car. The pair attempt to escape through the sewers, as Amaretto breaks down and tells Keith that her real name is Allison, and she knows AJ from a game of spin the bottle when they were classmates in fifth grade. While they flee through the sewers, they discover and burn a nest of vampires, but Allison is grabbed and held hostage by Katrina. After an arrow to the face and being staked in the chest with a pipe fail to stop Katrina, Keith kills her by opening a grating, allowing the sunlight to destroy her. Before they can escape to the surface, they are trapped by Vlad, Katrina's vampire consort, until Vlad is staked from behind by a revived AJ, who sheepishly notes that the stake he tried to kill himself with turned out to be formica.

As Keith and Allison climb to the surface daylight, AJ remains in the sewers calling out to him his ideas to go to night school, or work a job on a graveyard shift.

Cast
 Chris Makepeace as Keith
 Robert Rusler as AJ
 Grace Jones as Katrina
 Dedee Pfeiffer as Allison/Amaretto
 Gedde Watanabe as Duncan
 Billy Drago as Snow
 Sandy Baron as Vic
 Lisa Lyon as Cimmaron

Reception
Reviews were mixed to negative. Roger Ebert gave the film 2 stars out of 4, writing that there were "some funny lines, and the relationship between the human kid and his best pal the vampire is handled with a lot of original twists. But the movie finally descends, as so many films do these days, to one of those assembly-line endings made up of fights and chases." D. J. R. Bruckner of The New York Times called the writing and direction "weak" and the story "so confused, that 'Vamp' often seems as silly as the films it tries to ridicule." A positive review in Variety praised the film as "extremely imaginative" with a "very good" cast, and referred to Grace Jones' dance number as "an outré showstopper." Patrick Goldstein of the Los Angeles Times wrote, "Despite a few delightfully grim comic touches, 'Vamp' never really captures the spirit of light-headed horror needed to propel this kind of macabre mayhem. Writer-director Richard Wenk has a real flair for offbeat humor ... but we find ourselves much more enchanted by the film's kooky peripheral characters than by its plodding storyline." Paul Attanasio of The Washington Post panned the film as "stupid and crude." Sid Smith of the Chicago Tribune gave the film 1.5 stars out of 4, writing that "the laughs are strained, and many of the effects are ludicrous. The filmmakers couldn't come up with enough good plot and dialogue to fill in the gaps between their little satirical stabs." A review by Mark Finch in The Monthly Film Bulletin was generally positive, finding that although the concept of a club where the strippers possess authority could have been explored more, "the film remains confident and agreeably scary without becoming lost in a swamp of movie-buff jokes or out-and-out campiness."

Vamp holds a 40% rating on Rotten Tomatoes based on ten reviews.

Influences
Many viewers argue that Vamp heavily influenced Robert Rodriguez's From Dusk till Dawn (1996); from the setting of a strip club, to the sexy dance/performance put on by the lead female characters in each respective film. Vamp tells the story of two fraternity pledges looking to find a stripper at the "After Dark" club, which so happens to be home to a group of stripper vampires, whereas From Dusk till Dawn tells the story of two fugitive bank-robbing brothers who are fleeing the FBI as well as the Texas police and end up at the "Titty Twister", a strip club in the middle of a desolate part of Mexico which, in comparison to Vamp, happens to be home to a group of Aztec stripper vampires.

Release
Vamp was released theatrically in the United States on July 18, 1986 and grossed $4,941,117 at the box office.

Arrow Video released Vamp on Blu-ray/DVD in the US on October 4, 2016 and the UK Blu-ray/DVD release on October 3, 2016. This version of the film features a high definition digital transfer along with special features.

See also
List of American films of 1986
Vampire films

References

External links

1986 films
1986 horror films
1980s comedy horror films
American comedy horror films
Films directed by Richard Wenk
Films shot in Los Angeles
Films scored by Jonathan Elias
Films with screenplays by Richard Wenk
American vampire films
Vampire comedy films
New World Pictures films
1986 comedy films
Films about striptease
1986 directorial debut films
1980s English-language films
1980s American films